The Essonne is a  long French river.  It is a left tributary of the Seine.  Its course crosses the departments of Loiret and Essonne, and it gives its name to the latter.  The Essone's name and the present name of its higher course (the Œuf) originate in Acionna, a Gallo-Roman river goddess attested at Orléans (Genabum).

Geography
Notably it runs through Malesherbes and La Ferté-Alais, before running into the Seine at Corbeil-Essonnes.

The other tributaries are short streams (the Velvette, the Ru de D’Huison, the Ru de Misery off the left bank; Ru de Boigny and the Ru de Ballancourt off the right bank).

From Corbeil-Essonnes to its terminus at Malesherbes, the RER D runs along the valley of the Essonne.  Part of the basin feeding the Essonne, as well as its course between Malesherbes and La Ferté-Alais, are in the parc naturel régional du Gâtinais français.

Communes
The Essonne runs through the communes of:

 In Loiret 
 La Neuville-sur-Essonne ~ Aulnay-la-Rivière ~ Ondreville-sur-Essonne ~ Briarres-sur-Essonne ~  Dimancheville ~ Orville ~ Augerville-la-Rivière

 In Seine-et-Marne 
 Boulancourt ~ Buthiers

 In Loiret 
 Malesherbes

 In Seine-et-Marne
 Nanteau-sur-Essonne

 In Essonne 
 Boigneville ~ Prunay-sur-Essonne ~ Buno-Bonnevaux ~ Gironville-sur-Essonne ~ Maisse ~ Courdimanche-sur-Essonne ~ Boutigny-sur-Essonne ~ Vayres-sur-Essonne ~ Guigneville-sur-Essonne ~ La Ferté-Alais ~ Baulne ~ Itteville ~ Ballancourt-sur-Essonne ~ Vert-le-Petit ~ Fontenay-le-Vicomte ~ Écharcon ~ Mennecy ~ Lisses ~ Ormoy ~ Villabé ~ Corbeil-Essonnes

References

External links
 Siarce
 Parc naturel régional du Gâtinais français

Rivers of France
Rivers of Essonne
Rivers of Île-de-France